Kolby Carlile (born July 5, 1997) is an American Flat Track racer from the United States who has competed in the championship since 2013, winning the American Flat Track Singles Championship in 2017.

American Flat Track

Carlile has raced in the AMA Pro Flat Track Series since 2013, and started at the age of just 16.  He finished 18th at the Hagerstown, Maryland in his rookie year.  In 2014, Carlile raced in eight main events and scored four top-10 finishes to earn 9th place in the championship. 
In 2015, Carlile scored seven top-10 finishes for 10th place in the championship.
Carlile finished fourth in the 2016 season with his first victory at the Charlotte Half-Mile.
He joined the Estenson Racing Team in July 2017.

Career highlights
2013– Rookie year, AMA GNC2 Championship    K.C. Cycle KTM 450 SX-F
2014– 9th, AMA GNC2 Championship    K.C. Cycle KTM 450 SX-F
2015– 10th, AMA GNC2 Championship K.C. Cycle KTM 450 SX-F
2017– American Flat Track Singles Champion    Extension Racing Yamaha YZ450F

References

1997 births
Living people
American motorcycle racers